is a passenger railway station in located in the city of  Kyōtango, Kyoto Prefecture, Japan, operated by the private railway company Willer Trains (Kyoto Tango Railway).

Lines
Yūhigaura-Kitsu-onsen Station is a station of the Miyazu Line, and is located 61.1 kilometers from the terminus of the line at Nishi-Maizuru Station.

Station layout
The station has one ground-level side platform serving  single bi-directional track. The station is unattended.

Adjacent stations

History
It was renamed  on April 1, 1990, and to its present name on April 1,2015.

Passenger statistics
In fiscal 2018, the station was used by an average of 104 passengers daily.

Surrounding area
 Kizu Onsen
 Yūhigaura Onsen
 Japan National Route 178

See also
List of railway stations in Japan

References

External links

Official home page 

Railway stations in Kyoto Prefecture
Railway stations in Japan opened in 1931
Kyōtango